Us or Else: Letter to the System is a compilation album by American hip hop recording artist T.I. It was independently released on December 16, 2016, by Grand Hustle Records and Roc Nation. The project, which was initially issued as a Tidal exclusive, serves as an extended version of his EP, simply titled Us or Else (2016).

The project features an array of artists, including Hustle Gang affiliates Quavo, Meek Mill, Ra Ra, Gizzle, Tokyo Jetz, B.o.B, London Jae, Big K.R.I.T., Killer Mike and Charlie Wilson, among others. The projects production was handled by The Digital Natives, The-Dream, Lil' C, Mars, Mike & Keys, MP808, Nottz, TBHits, Trev Case and more.

Background

On February 22, 2016, T.I. announced he signed a distribution deal with Jay Z's Roc Nation company. T.I. also revealed he is one of the new co-owners of online streaming service, TIDAL. On July 22, 2016, during an interview with Ebro in the Morning on Hot 97, T.I. announced an EP, titled Us or Else. The EP was described to "be aimed at supporting the Black Lives Matter movement, and will speak explicitly about the twisted road race relations took in America to arrive at its current precarious state." The EP was also in response to the turmoil caused by the injustices going on in America, namely police brutality following the deaths of Philando Castile and Alton Sterling. The EP was ultimately released for streaming on September 23, 2016, via Tidal, with it being released to other markets on September 30. On December 16, 2016, without prior announcement or promotion, T.I. released Us or Else: Letter to the System.

Critical reception

The compilation received generally positive reviews from music critics and fans alike. Da'Shan Smith of Pitchfork praised "the bevy of showcasing guest appearances—from Jacksonville-based Tokyo Jetz's annihilating turn on "Lazy" to fellow Atlantian London Jae's raspy flow on the backwoods baptism of "Pain"—embody two core principles of BLM: community and the advancement of future generations. With his generosity, the self-proclaimed "Grand Hustler" is repositioning himself in the vein of someone like Dr. Dre, who in 2015 introduced the wider world to Anderson .Paak on Compton." Aaron McKrell of HipHopDX wrote "Us or Else: Letter to the System equates in not only one of the year's strongest full-length projects but in Tip's discography as well. It's a suitable blend of his personal views to package aware commentary of our turbulent times in the United States in 2016."

Track listing

Personnel
Credits for Us or Else: Letter to the System adapted from AllMusic.

Big K.R.I.T. – featured artist
Derek Blythe – composer
B.o.B – featured artist
Trev Case – featured artist
Trevor Case – composer
Michael Cox – composer
The-Dream – featured artist
Lamar Edwards – composer
John Groover – composer
Clifford Harris – composer
London Jae – featured artist
Tokyo Jetz – featured artist
Killer Mike – featured artist
Gizzle – featured artist
Jacquez Lowe – composer
Translee Macklin – composer
Quavious Marshall – composer
Meek Mill – featured artist
Terius Nash – composer
Shauntrell Pender – composer
Glenda Proby – composer
Quavo – featured artist
Ra Ra – featured artist
Michael Render – composer
Arthur Ross – composer
B Rossi – featured artist
Brandon Rossi – composer
Justin Scott – composer
Bobby Simmons – composer
Mitchelle'l Sium – composer
Rodriqueiz Smith – composer
T.I. – primary artist
Jayceon Taylor – composer
Translee – featured artist
Leon Ware – composer
Robert Williams – composer
Charlie Wilson – composer, featured artist

Charts

Release history

References

External links

T.I. albums
Roc Nation compilation albums
Grand Hustle Records compilation albums
Albums produced by The-Dream
Albums produced by Lil' C (record producer)
Albums produced by Mars (record producer)
Albums produced by Nottz
Concept albums
Political hip hop albums
Protest songs
Political rap songs
Songs against racism and xenophobia
Reissue albums
Works about police brutality
Songs about police brutality